Tusura Airstrip, also known as Balangir Airstrip  is a public airstrip located at Tusura in the Balangir district of Odisha. Nearest airport/airstrip to this airstrip is Utkela Airstrip in Bhawanipatna, Odisha. There are plans to upgrade the facility and use it as a second base for flight school by GATI in the state.

References

Airports in Odisha
Transport in Balangir
Airports with year of establishment missing